A microsphere is a small spherical microparticle, with diameters typically ranging from 1 μm to 1000 μm (1 mm).

Microsphere may also refer to:
 Microsphere (software company), a 1980s software company who made several critically acclaimed games for the ZX Spectrum

See also
Glass microsphere
Expandable microsphere
Microbead
Microbead (research)
Optical microsphere